The Pakistan Navy ranks and insignia are the military insignia used by the Pakistan Navy. They are used to identify their roles as commanding officers and varies with their responsibilities. Pakistan shares a rank structure similar to that of the United Kingdom.

Officers

Chief petty officer & enlisted

References

External links
 

Pakistan Navy
Pakistan military-related lists